Himie Voxman (September 17, 1912 – November 22, 2011) was an American musician, teacher, university administrator, and composer known for producing many volumes of pedagogical compositions and literature for wind instruments.

Early life 
Himie Voxman was born in Centerville, Iowa on September 17, 1912 to Morris Voxman and Mollie Tzipanuk Voxman. His parents were Jewish Ukrainian immigrants who immigrated to the United States three years before Himie was born. Voxman was the fourth of five children, with three older siblings who were born in Ukraine (which was then part of the Russian Empire). Until Voxman was in high school, spellings of the surname varied among family members, including Vocksman, Vakcman, and Vaksman.

Education and career 
Voxman studied at the University of Iowa, receiving a bachelor's degree in chemical engineering in 1933 and a master's degree in 1934.  He became a faculty member at the university in 1939, and was director of the school of music from 1954 until his retirement in 1980. The Voxman Music Building at the university was named in his honor in 1995. Through his work, Voxman became one of the most well-known and respected music educators in the nation, with much of his work being published by Rubank, Inc.

Eugene Rousseau, the classical saxophonist, is one of his former students.

Affiliations and honors 
Voxman served on a number of associations and boards, including:

 Commission on Graduate Studies for the National Association of Schools of Music (Chairman)
 National Commission for Accreditation of Teacher Education and Welfare
 North Central Association of Colleges and Schools
 United States Department of Health, Education, and Welfare
 Academic Panel for cultural exchange projects for the United States Department of State 

He also received many honors throughout his career, including citations from collegiate fraternities and honors societies including Phi Mu Alpha Sinfonia, Mu Phi Epsilon, Pi Kappa Lambda, Sigma Alpha Iota, Tau Beta Pi, Phi Lambda Upsilon, and Sigma Xi. Additionally, he received awards from the following organizations:

 Iowa Bandmaster's Association: Honorary Life Membership
 Iowa Music Educators Association: Distinguished Service Award
 The Bell System: Silver Baton
 Coe College: Honorary doctorate
 DePaul University: Doctor of Humane Letters
 Federation of State High School Music Associations: Award of Merit 
 Missouri State High School Activities Association: Distinguished Service Award
 University of Iowa: Doctor of Humane Letters
 National Federation of State High School Associations: Induction into the National High School Hall of Fame under the Fine Arts category.

In 1984, he served as the woodwind judge for the final round of the Canadian National Competitive Festival of Music.

The University of Iowa School of Music's Voxman Building is named after Voxman.

Death 

Voxman died on November 22, 2011 in Iowa City at the age of 99.

References

External links
 Himie Voxman Research Archive Collection Guide - University of Iowa Libraries' Rita Benton Music Library.
 "Engineering graduate: clarinet LEGEND" by Anne Tanner, University of Iowa fyi Faculty & Staff News, Vol. 40, No. 2 (September 6, 2002).
 Himie Voxman - University of Iowa Alumni Association.
 Himie Voxman (video interview). NAMM Oral History Program, 2009-04-07. Retrieved on 2009-09-02.

American clarinetists
1912 births
2011 deaths
People from Centerville, Iowa
Musicians from Iowa
University of Iowa alumni
University of Iowa faculty